The Franklin School on Second St. SW in Jamestown, North Dakota was built in 1909.  It was designed by architect Joseph Bell DeRemer.

It was listed on the National Register of Historic Places (NRHP) in 2002.

According to its NRHP nomination, the building is an '"impressive Classical Revival style structure" and "the style was in keeping with early twentieth-century social sentiment that educational facilities generally reflect a nobility of purpose. The ninety-two-year-old building exhibits exceptional integrity of materials and design."

The building now houses CSi Cable Services, but the historical integrity of the building remains intact. Visitors can embark on self-guided tours. Visitors can walk the same halls as one of the school's famous students, Louis L'Amour.

References

External links
 Historic Franklin School - Visit Jamestown, ND

School buildings on the National Register of Historic Places in North Dakota
Neoclassical architecture in North Dakota
School buildings completed in 1909
Buildings and structures in Jamestown, North Dakota
Tourist attractions in Stutsman County, North Dakota
National Register of Historic Places in Stutsman County, North Dakota
1909 establishments in North Dakota
Schools in Stutsman County, North Dakota